On 18 March 2020, Israeli actress Gal Gadot posted a video on Instagram of her, and a supergroup of celebrity friends, singing a rendition of the song "Imagine" by John Lennon, which intended to raise morale in the face of the COVID-19 pandemic.

Origins
Gadot organized the video with help from Kristen Wiig. "Kristen is like the mayor of Hollywood," Gadot told Vanity Fair. "Everyone loves her, and she brought a bunch of people to the game. But yeah, I started it, and I can only say that I meant to do something good and pure..."

"The pandemic was in Europe and Israel before it came here (to the United States) in the same way. I was seeing where everything was headed." So she told Wiig, "Listen, I want to do this thing."

"Hey guys, Day 6 in self-quarantine, and I gotta say the past few days got me feeling a bit philosophical," Gadot explains in the video's introduction. "You know this virus has affected the entire world, everyone. Doesn’t matter who you are, where you’re from, we’re all in this together."

Gadot said she was inspired to make the video after seeing a man from Italy play "Imagine" on his saxophone from his balcony.

"I ran into this video of this Italian guy playing the trumpet in his balcony (sic) to all the other people who were locked inside their homes. and he was playing Imagine, and there was something so powerful and pure about this video..."

Participants

 Gal Gadot
 Kristen Wiig
 Jamie Dornan
 Labrinth
 James Marsden
 Sarah Silverman
 Eddie Benjamin
 Jimmy Fallon
 Natalie Portman
 Zoë Kravitz
 Sia
 Lynda Carter
 Amy Adams
 Leslie Odom Jr.
 Pedro Pascal
 Chris O’Dowd
 Dawn O'Porter
 Will Ferrell
 Mark Ruffalo
 Norah Jones
 Ashley Benson
 Kaia Gerber
 Cara Delevingne
 Annie Mumolo
 Maya Rudolph

Reception and parodies
The video received near-universal backlash, with critics dismissing it as an ineffective, out-of-touch, "cringey" response to the pandemic; Jon Caramanica of The New York Times called it "an empty and profoundly awkward gesture". Gadot later acknowledged the video did not garner the positive reaction that had been intended, but was unapologetic in explaining the thinking behind it. Gadot acknowledged the video ended up being in "poor taste", but still maintained that it was made with "pure intentions." 

The video was parodied by comedian Zack Fox, whose version was based on the song "Slob on My Nob" by Tear Da Club Up Thugs. Fox's version featured appearances from Eric André, Thundercat, 6lack, Quinta Brunson, Langston Kerman and Chuck Inglish, among others. Experimental musician Lingua Ignota also remixed the audio of Gadot's version in noise music style.

The video was also parodied on the series The Boys, in the opening scene of the episode "Herogasm" in which the character of The Deep, himself a parody of Aquaman (rather than Queen Maeve, the show's parody of Wonder Woman - the character famously portrayed by Gadot) mirrors Gadot's comments about feeling philosophical before starting to sing "Imagine" followed by celebrities such as Patton Oswalt, Mila Kunis, Ashton Kutcher, Rose Byrne, Kumail Nanjiani, Josh Gad and others individually singing a line of the song each.

References

External links
 

Viral videos
2020 short films
Internet memes related to the COVID-19 pandemic
Works about the COVID-19 pandemic
John Lennon